"Red River Valley" is a folk song and cowboy music standard of uncertain origins that has gone by different names (such as "Cowboy Love Song", "Bright Sherman Valley", "Bright Laurel Valley", "In the Bright Mohawk Valley", and "Bright Little Valley"), depending on where it has been sung. It is listed as Roud Folk Song Index 756 and by Edith Fowke as FO 13. It is recognizable by its chorus (with several variations):

Members of the Western Writers of America chose it as one of the Top 100 Western songs of all time, ranked #10.

Lyrics and chords
 Wikiversity offers more help singing this song

Origins
According to Canadian folklorist Edith Fowke, there is anecdotal evidence that the song was known in at least five Canadian provinces before 1896. This finding led to speculation that the song was composed at the time of the 1870 Wolseley Expedition to Manitoba's northern Red River Valley. It expresses the sorrow of a local woman (possibly a Métis) as her soldier lover prepares to return to the east.

The earliest known written manuscript of the lyrics, titled "The Red River Valley", bears the notations "Nemaha 1879" and "Harlan 1885." Nemaha and Harlan are the names of counties in Nebraska, and are also the names of towns in Iowa.

The song appears in sheet music, titled "In the Bright Mohawk Valley", printed in New York in 1896 with James J. Kerrigan as the writer. The tune and lyrics were collected and published in Carl Sandburg's 1927 American Songbag.

In 1925, Carl T. Sprague, an early singing cowboy from Texas, recorded it as "Cowboy Love Song" (Victor 20067, August 5, 1925), but it was fellow Texan Jules Verne Allen's 1929 "Cowboy's Love Song" (Victor 40167, March 28, 1929), that gave the song its greatest popularity. Allen himself thought the song was from Pennsylvania, perhaps brought over from Europe.

Another important recording in this song's history was the 1927 Columbia Records master (15206-D) performed by Hugh Cross and Riley Puckett, under the actual title of "Red River Valley".  This was the very first commercially available recording of this song under its most familiar title, and was the inspiration for many of the recordings that followed.

Jimmie Rodgers wrote new lyrics titled "Dear Old Sunny South by the Sea", and recorded by himself in 1928.

Recordings
1924 Luther B. Clarke  "Bright Sherman Valley" (Columbia 15069-D)
1926 Kelly Harrell "Bright Sherman Valley" (Victor 20527 9 June 1926).
1927 Hugh Cross and Riley Puckett "Red River Valley" (Columbia 15206-D).
1928 Jimmie Rodgers "Dear Old Sunny South by the Sea".
1944 Woody Guthrie for Asch Recordings 19 April 1944. Guthrie also recorded for Asch the Spanish Civil War version, "Jarama Valley".
 1946  Gene Autry recorded "Red River Valley" for Columbia Records on August 30, 1946 which issued in 1947 with the 78 rpm set Gene Autry's Western Classics and later appeared on various compilations including The Gene Autry Collection and The Essential Gene Autry 1933-1946.
1947–50 Bill Haley and the Four Aces of Western Swing – vocal by Tex King.
1948 Jo Stafford and the Starlighters recorded August 28, 1948 for Capitol Records (catalogue No. 742)
1950s Jack Arthur for Peter Pan Records (453B).
1955 Norman Luboff Choir – the song was featured in their album, Songs of the West.
1956 Jimmy Wakely recorded the song for his album, Santa Fe Trail.
1959 Bing Crosby recorded the song for his album, How the West Was Won.
In the 1950s and 1960s, Al Hurricane recorded an instrumental version, which was released as a single by Warner Records, it was also released on the 1973 album, Instrumentales con Al Hurricane. This version's pacing would become the basis for the popular 1959 Johnny and the Hurricanes "Red River Rock" version of the song. The track made use of traditional New Mexico music and Western music, while mixing rock and early electronic music synthesizers.
1960, Marty Robbins recorded it for his album More Greatest Hits by Marty Robbins (CS 8435). He also sang this song live on his show. 
1961 Connie Francis recorded "Red River Valley" for her 1961 album release, Connie Francis Sings Folk Song Favorites. 
1963 The Ventures released a version on their 1963 Dolton album, The Ventures Play Telstar and the Lonely Bull, BST 8019.
1966 the children of Eriskay School, in the Outer Hebrides of Scotland, were recorded by fieldworker Rosemary Hutcheson of the School of Scottish Studies.
1977 Slim Whitman's version was included on his 1977 number one hit UK album, Red River Valley.
1990 Michael Martin Murphy recorded a version that was released on the 1990 album, Cowboy Songs.
2004 Don Edwards recorded a version on The Last of The Troubadours: Saddle Songs Vol II.
2019 Bill Frisell included the song in his album, Harmony.
A Czech version (Červená řeka) by Helena Vondráčková also exists.
An Estonian version with Harald Ferdinand Suurkask's words Kaugel, Kaugel, kus on minu kodu has been performed by many artists including Ivo Linna, Tarmo Pihlap & Apelsin, Lindpriid and Parvepoisid.

"Red River Valley" has also been recorded by Roy Acuff, Arlo Guthrie, Lynn Anderson, the Andrews Sisters, Eddy Arnold, Moe Bandy, Suzy Bogguss, Johnny Bond, Boxcar Willie, Elton Britt, John Darnielle, Foster & Allen, Larry Groce, the McGuire Sisters, the Mills Brothers, Michael Martin Murphey, Johnnie Ray, Riders in the Sky, Riders of the Purple Sage, Tex Ritter, Marty Robbins, Jimmie Rodgers, Roy Rogers, Pete Seeger, the Sons of the Pioneers, Tex Morton, Billy Walker, Roger Whittaker, Cassandra Wilson, Glenn Yarbrough, James McMurtry and George Strait.

Film appearances
1936, Gene Autry sang the song in the Republic film Red River Valley and, with the Cass County Boys, sang the song again in the 1946 film Sioux City Sue.
1939, The Three Stooges sing the song in the short film Yes, We Have No Bonanza.
1940, It was particularly memorable in John Ford's The Grapes of Wrath, whose tale of displaced Oklahomans associated it with the southern Red River.
1943, An instrumental version appeared in the film The Ox-Bow Incident. 
1953, It was sung first by people in a pub with slightly different lyrics and more briefly at other points in a film about British paratroopers during WWII called The Red Beret. 
1962, An instrumental version played on a harp by Harpo Marx in Episode 1-4 "The Musicale" of ABC's Mr. Smith Goes to Washington, a sitcom starring Fess Parker, based on the 1939 Frank Capra film. This was Harpo Marx's last television appearance.
1971, Another film in which it had important – but more subtle – usage in was The Last Picture Show a film about the internal decay of small town Texas in the early 1950s.
1973, The song was used instrumentally in Dillinger, as a recurring theme for John Dillinger's longing for his boyhood home and his family.
1979, Carol Connors sang it in the X-rated movie, Sweet Savage.
1981, Lorraine De Selle and Zora Ulla Keslerová sing the song in video nasty, Cannibal Ferox.
1987, An electronic rendition of "Red River Rock" was recorded by Silicon Teens, and featured in the movie Planes, Trains and Automobiles.
1989, The song was sung in an adult contemporary style on the Shining Time Station episode, "Mapping It Out". It also appeared on the direct to video special Jukebox Band Lullaby.
1990, Played in the film score when the gang member played by David Morse meets his demise in the movie, Desperate Hours.
1993, Dana Delany sang it in the film Tombstone, though not in its entirety.
2006, Sung by Garrison Keillor and cast in the film, A Prairie Home Companion.
2014, A part of the song was sung in the film Wild, by child actor Evan O'Toole during a scene with Reese Witherspoon.
2017, Harry Dean Stanton sang it in Part 10 of Twin Peaks.
2017, A harmonica version played repeatedly in the film, Lucky.

TV appearances
1962-63, sung by Ken Curtis on his TV series, Ripcord, with Harry Carey Jr. playing guitar.  It was on one of two guest appearances Carey made on the show (one in 1962, the other in 1963).

Other cultural references
 The song is played by Randall in Recess in the episode "One Stayed Clean", while he is sitting with TJ, Gus and the diggers in their hole. In the episode, the gang helps Gus (who has never had a picture day because of his constantly changing schools) stay clean so he can have a great school photo.
 "Red River Valley" was the theme song of Our Gal Sunday, a soap opera broadcast on CBS radio from 1937 to 1959.
"Jarama Valley", a song about the Battle of Jarama of the Spanish Civil War, used the tune to "Red River Valley". It was recorded by Woody Guthrie and The Almanac Singers, featuring Pete Seeger.
The tune to "Red River Valley", set to new lyrics and entitled "Can I Sleep In Your Arms", was used on Willie Nelson's 1975 album, Red Headed Stranger. This version was based on the song "Can I Sleep in your Barn Tonight Mister."
Johnny Cash wrote and performed a humorous song entitled "Please Don't Play Red River Valley" for his 1966 album, Everybody Loves a Nut
Bob Dylan wrote and recorded "Red River Shore" — which uses motifs and plays with themes from "Red River Valley" — for Time Out of Mind (1997). Left off the album, two versions of it were included in The Bootleg Series Vol. 8: Tell Tale Signs: Rare and Unreleased 1989–2006 in 2008.
The Kidsongs Kids parodied this song on their 1995 Let's Put on a Show video as "We'll Put on a Show".
 The Swedish song "I'm a Lapp", recorded in 1959 by Sven-Gösta Jonsson, is based on the melody of "Red River Valley."
Johnny and the Hurricanes recorded a rock and roll instrumental version in 1959 of the song entitled "Red River Rock" which became a hit in both the US (#5), the UK (#3), and Canada (#3).
The tune of "Red River Valley" was used for the verses of the 1963 Connie Francis hit "Drownin' My Sorrows" (#36).
"Drownin' My Sorrows" was covered in German as "Ich tausche mit keinem auf der Welt" in 1964 by Margot Eskens, and in Croatian as "Uz Tebe Sam Sretna" in 1968 by Ana Štefok.
The premier Czech vocalist Helena Vondráčková made her recording debut in September 1964 with "Červená řeka", a rendering of "Red River Valley".
A fatalistic chorus can be found in some sources related to F-105 pilots in Vietnam:

In its soundtrack, the 2010 video game Fallout: New Vegas adapted the lyrics and tune of "Red River Valley" as "New Vegas Valley".
The first four verses of the chant "Scouser Tommy", sung by supporters of Liverpool F.C., is to the tune of "Red River Valley".
"Red River Valley" is also the official Slow March of the Fort Garry Horse, a reserve Line Cavalry Regiment of the Canadian Army.
The 19th Century Manitoba song "Red River Valley" is played weekly on Philippine TV on a GMA TV comedy show called Bubble Gang, with varied Tagalog humorous lyrics sung to the accompaniment of ukuleles. This has occurred from circa 2011 to present day, by various performers.
David McEnery (1914–2002), singer-songwriter otherwise known as Red River Dave
The Ant and the Grasshopper story is sung to the tune of Red River Valley in a Cocomelon video (2018).

Sources
Edith Fowke and Keith MacMillan. (1973). The Penguin Book of Canadian Folk Songs. Harmondsworth, Middlesex: Penguin.
Allen, Jules Verne. "Singing Along" (reprinted from New Mexico Magazine, 1935). Roundup of Western Literature: An Anthology for Young Readers pp. 82–85, edited by Oren Arnold.
Kerrigan, James J. "In The Bright Mohawk Valley". New York: Howley, Haviland & Co. (1896).
Fowke, Edith "The Red River Valley Re-examined." Western Folklore 23 (July 1964) 1630–71.
Fuld, James J. The Book of World-Famous Music: Classical, Popular, and Folk. Dover Publications (2000).
Waltz, Robert B; David G. Engle. "The Red River Valley". The Traditional Ballad Index: An Annotated Bibliography of the Folk Songs of the English-Speaking World. Hosted by California State University, Fresno, Folklore, 2007.

References

External links
National Institute of Environmental Health Sciences Kids' Page (lyrics and audio file)
The free score on 8notes.com
free-scores.com
"Mitnoe'a Ha-Sappan" at Zemereshet – early Hebrew version set to this melody

Canadian folk songs
Western music (North America)
Children's songs
Songs about Texas
Songs about rivers
Johnnie Ray songs
Year of song unknown
American Songbag songs
Songwriter unknown
Red River of the North
Slim Whitman songs